Hans Jørgen Holm (9 May 1835 – 22 July 1916) was a Danish architect. A pupil of Johan Daniel Herholdt, he became a professor at the Royal Danish Academy of Fine Arts and a leading Danish proponent of the  National Romantic style.

Biography
Holm was born in Copenhagen, Denmark. He was the son of Carl Jacob Holm and Johanne Henriette f. Kierulf.

He studied at the city's College of Advanced Technology before being admitted to the Royal Academy of Fine Arts, where he graduated in 1855.
 In the same time he worked for Gustav Friederich Hetsch and Johan Daniel Herholdt. 
 
From 1866-79, he was an assistant teaching  architectural art at the architectural school and at the model school 1867-70. From 1883 to 1908, he was professor at the architectural school. In 1872-73, he was a building inspector in the City of Copenhagen. From 1883-1908, he was a professor at the Royal Danish Academy. He served as the architect of Roskilde Cathedral from 1898-1915.
	
He died during  1916 in Ordrup and was buried at  Vestre Kirkegård  in Copenhagen.

Published works
Tegninger af ældre nordisk Arkitektur (1872-84) 
 Studierejser af Kunstakademiets Elever  I-II (1873-87)

Selected works
 Diakonissestiftelsen, the first three wings (1873–76)
 Rysensteen Gymnasium, then Tietgensgades  School, Copenhagen (1885–86)
 Cattle Market (1885–86) with slaughterhouses (1887), Brown Meatpacking District, Copenhagen
 Vestre Cemetery, Copenhagen (1883-)
Northern Chapel, Vestre Cemetery  (1892)
Southern Chapel, now the focal point of the Crossroads Project, Vestre Cemetery (1905)
 Museum of Geology, Copenhagen (1888–93)
 Skive Church, Skive (1896–98)
 Royal Danish Library, Slotsholmen, Copenhagen (1898–1906)

Gallery

See also
 List of Danish architects

References

Danish architects
1835 births
1916 deaths
 People from Copenhagen
Royal Danish Academy of Fine Arts alumni